Thorniewood is one of the twenty-one wards used to elect members of the North Lanarkshire Council. It elects three councillors and covers the Viewpark, Tannochside and Birkenshaw areas. Its south-west boundary is the M74 motorway bordering the Bothwell and Uddingston ward of South Lanarkshire (the localities of Thorniewood were often historically considered parts of Uddingston, particularly before the two parts were divided between the districts of Hamilton and Motherwell in 1975).

A 2017 national review caused the territory to be reduced, the east boundary moving westwards from the A725 bypass resulting in the loss of the Fallside neighbourhood and the unpopulated Righead Industrial Estate; however, housebuilding elsewhere meant the decrease in the electorate was minimal. The ward had a population of 13,950 in 2019.

Councillors

Election Results

2017 Election

2019 By-election
On 1 Jul 2019, Labour councillor Hugh Gaffney resigned his seat after he was elected as MP for Coatbridge, Chryston and Bellshill at the 2017 UK Parliament Election. A by-election was held on 19 September 2019 and the seat was retained by Labour by Norah Moody.

2021 By-election
SNP councillor Steven Bonnar was elected as MP for Coatbridge, Chryston and Bellshill at the 2019 UK Parliament Election. He resigned his Council seat and the by-election was set for May but was deferred until 19 November 2020. It was won by Helen Loughran for Labour.

2012 Election

2015 By-election

SNP Cllr Duncan McShannon resigned his seat in May 2015. A by-election was held on 9 July 2015 and the seat was held by the party's Stephen Bonnar.

2007 Election

References

Wards of North Lanarkshire